Lukáš Štetina (born 28 July 1991) is a Slovak professional footballer who currently plays for Slovak  club Spartak Trnava. He was a member of the Slovakia U21 and is currently a member of the broader squad of Slovakia.

Club career

Early career
Štetina made his Corgoň Liga debut for FC Nitra in a 1–1 draw against MŠK Žilina on 11 July 2009. He scored his first goal in a 2–0 win against Dunajská Streda. He played 24 matches in his first Corgoň Liga season. In the next season he made 18 appearances for Nitra and then was transferred to Ukrainian club Metalist Kharkiv in March 2011.

Metalist Kharkiv
Štetina debuted in the Ukrainian Premier League in a 0–0 draw against Vorskla on 5 March 2011. He played only two matches in the 2010–11 season and failed to make a league appearance in the 2011–12 season. He returned to Slovakia in February 2012, signing a half-year loan deal with Tatran Prešov. Štetina joined Czech club Dukla Prague on a year's loan in July 2012, making his Czech First League debut on 28 July 2012, playing four minutes as a substitute in a 1–1 draw against Sparta Prague.

International career
Štetina represented Slovakia in the 2008 UEFA European Under-17 Football Championship elite round, making his competitive debut against Serbia on 26 March 2008. He subsequently played for his country at under-19 and under-21 level.

Štetina made his senior international debut in an infamous goal-less friendly tie against Gibraltar in November 2013. He only returned to the national team match four years later, when he played the first half of a friendly match against Ukraine, giving Slovakia the lead in the 10th minute, by a tap-in, which followed Albert Rusnák's free kick, Hamšík's header and a failed save by Andriy Pyatov.

He only made a return to the national team in March 2019, after the international retirement of Martin Škrtel, having been nominated for a double UEFA Euro 2020 qualifying fixture against Hungary and Wales.

International goals

Honours

Club
Sparta Prague
 Czech Cup: 2019–20

References

External links

1991 births
Living people
Sportspeople from Nitra
Association football central defenders
Slovak footballers
Slovakia international footballers
Slovak expatriate footballers
FC Nitra players
FC Metalist Kharkiv players
1. FC Tatran Prešov players
FK Dukla Prague players
Slovak Super Liga players
Ukrainian Premier League players
Czech First League players
AC Sparta Prague players
Expatriate footballers in Ukraine
Expatriate footballers in the Czech Republic
Slovak expatriate sportspeople in the Czech Republic
Slovak expatriate sportspeople in Ukraine
FC Slovan Liberec players
Slovakia youth international footballers
Slovakia under-21 international footballers